Serena Williams was the defending champion, but chose not to compete this year.

Petra Kvitová won the title, defeating Li Na in the final 7–5, 2–6, 6–3.

Seeds
All seeds receive a bye into the second round.

Draw

Finals

Top half

Section 1

Section 2

Bottom half

Section 3

Section 4

Qualifying

Seeds

Qualifiers

Lucky losers

  Urszula Radwańska
  Galina Voskoboeva

Draw

First qualifier

Second qualifier

Third qualifier

Fourth qualifier

Fifth qualifier

Sixth qualifier

Seventh qualifier

Eighth qualifier

References
General

Specific

2012 WTA Tour
Women's Singles
2012 in Canadian women's sports